The 980s decade ran from January 1, 980, to December 31, 989.

Significant people
 At-Ta'i
 Pope John XV

References